This is a timeline of the history of hydrogen technology.

Timeline

16th century
 c. 1520 – First recorded observation of hydrogen by Paracelsus through dissolution of metals (iron, zinc, and tin) in sulfuric acid.

17th century
 1625 – First description of hydrogen by Johann Baptista van Helmont. First to use the word "gas".
 1650 – Turquet de Mayerne obtained a gas or "inflammable air" by the action of dilute sulphuric acid on iron.
 1662 – Boyle's law (gas law relating pressure and volume)
 1670 – Robert Boyle produced hydrogen by reacting metals with acid.
 1672 – "New Experiments touching the Relation between Flame and Air" by Robert Boyle.
 1679 – Denis Papin – safety valve
 1700 – Nicolas Lemery showed that the gas produced in the sulfuric acid/iron reaction was explosive in air

18th century
 1755 – Joseph Black confirmed that different gases exist. / Latent heat
 1766 – Henry Cavendish published in "On Factitious Airs" a description of "dephlogisticated air" by reacting zinc metal with hydrochloric acid and isolated a gas 7 to 11 times lighter than air.
 1774 – Joseph Priestley isolated and categorized oxygen.
 1780 – Felice Fontana discovers the water-gas shift reaction
 1783 – Antoine Lavoisier gave hydrogen its name (Gk: hydro = water, genes = born of)
 1783 – Jacques Charles made the first flight with his hydrogen balloon "La Charlière".
 1783 – Antoine Lavoisier and Pierre Laplace measured the heat of combustion of hydrogen using an ice calorimeter.
 1784 – Jean-Pierre Blanchard, attempted a dirigible hydrogen balloon, but it would not steer.
 1784 – The invention of the  Lavoisier Meusnier iron-steam process,  generating hydrogen by passing water vapor over a bed of red-hot iron at 600 °C.
 1785 – Jean-François Pilâtre de Rozier built the hybrid Rozière balloon.
 1787 – Charles's law (gas law, relating volume and temperature)
 1789 – Jan Rudolph Deiman and Adriaan Paets van Troostwijk using an electrostatic machine and a Leyden jar for the first electrolysis of water.
 1800 – William Nicholson and Anthony Carlisle decomposed water into hydrogen and oxygen by electrolysis with a voltaic pile.
 1800 – Johann Wilhelm Ritter duplicated the experiment with a rearranged set of electrodes to collect the two gases separately.

19th century
 1801 – Humphry Davy discovers the concept of the Fuel Cell.
 1806 – François Isaac de Rivaz built the de Rivaz engine, the first internal combustion engine powered by a mixture of hydrogen and oxygen.
 1809 – Thomas Forster observed with a theodolite the drift of small free pilot balloons filled with "inflammable gas"
 1809 – Gay-Lussac's law (gas law, relating temperature and pressure)
 1811 – Amedeo Avogadro – Avogadro's law a gas law
 1819 – Edward Daniel Clarke invented the hydrogen gas blowpipe.
 1820 – W. Cecil wrote a letter "On the application of hydrogen gas to produce a moving power in machinery"
 1823 – Goldsworthy Gurney demonstrated limelight.
 1823 – Döbereiner's Lamp a lighter invented by Johann Wolfgang Döbereiner.
 1823 – Goldsworthy Gurney devised an oxy-hydrogen blowpipe.
 1824 – Michael Faraday invented the rubber balloon.
 1826 – Thomas Drummond built the Drummond Light.
 1826 – Samuel Brown tested his internal combustion engine by using it to propel a vehicle up Shooter's Hill
 1834 – Michael Faraday published Faraday's laws of electrolysis.
 1834 – Benoît Paul Émile Clapeyron – Ideal gas law
 1836 – John Frederic Daniell invented a primary cell in which hydrogen was eliminated in the generation of the electricity.
 1839 – Christian Friedrich Schönbein published the principle of the fuel cell in the "Philosophical Magazine".
 1839 – William Robert Grove developed the Grove cell.
 1842 – William Robert Grove developed the first fuel cell (which he called the gas voltaic battery)
 1849 – Eugène Bourdon – Bourdon gauge (manometer)
 1863 – Etienne Lenoir made a test drive from Paris to Joinville-le-Pont with the 1-cylinder, 2-stroke Hippomobile running on coal gas
 1866 – August Wilhelm von Hofmann invents the Hofmann voltameter for the electrolysis of water.
 1873 – Thaddeus S. C. Lowe – Water gas, the process used the water gas shift reaction.
 1874 – Jules Verne – The Mysterious Island, "water will one day be employed as fuel, that hydrogen and oxygen of which it is constituted will be used"
 1884 – Charles Renard and Arthur Constantin Krebs launch the airship La France.
 1885 – Zygmunt Florenty Wróblewski published hydrogen's critical temperature as 33 K; critical pressure, 13.3 atmospheres; and boiling point, 23 K.
 1889 – Ludwig Mond and Carl Langer coined the name fuel cell and tried to build one running on air and Mond gas.
 1893 – Friedrich Wilhelm Ostwald experimentally determined the interconnected roles of the various components of the fuel cell.
 1895 – Hydrolysis
 1896 – Jackson D.D. and Ellms J.W., hydrogen production by microalgae (Anabaena)
 1896 – Leon Teisserenc de Bort carries out experiments with high flying instrumental weather balloons.
 1897 – Paul Sabatier facilitated the use of hydrogenation with the discovery of the Sabatier reaction.
 1898 –  James Dewar liquefied hydrogen by using regenerative cooling and his invention, the vacuum flask at the Royal Institution of Great Britain in London.
 1899 –  James Dewar collected solid hydrogen for the first time.
 1900 – Count Ferdinand von Zeppelin launched the first hydrogen-filled Zeppelin LZ1 airship.

20th century
 1901 – Wilhelm Normann introduced the hydrogenation of fats.
 1903 – Konstantin Eduardovich Tsiolkovskii published "The Exploration of Cosmic Space by Means of Reaction Devices"
 1907 – Lane hydrogen producer
 1909 – Count Ferdinand Adolf August von Zeppelin made the first long distance flight with the Zeppelin LZ5.
 1909 – Linde–Frank–Caro process
 1910 – The first Zeppelin passenger flight with the Zeppelin LZ7.
 1910 – Fritz Haber patented the Haber process.
 1912 – The first scheduled international Zeppelin passenger flights with the Zeppelin LZ13.
 1913 – Niels Bohr explains the Rydberg formula for the spectrum of hydrogen by imposing a quantization condition on classical orbits of the electron in hydrogen
 1919 – The first Atlantic crossing by airship with the Beardmore HMA R34.
 1920 – Hydrocracking, a plant for the commercial hydrogenation of brown coal is commissioned at Leuna in Germany.
 1923 – Steam reforming, the first synthetic methanol is produced by BASF in Leuna
 1923 – J. B. S. Haldane envisioned in Daedalus; or, Science and the Future "great power stations where during windy weather the surplus power will be used for the electrolytic decomposition of water into oxygen and hydrogen."
 1926 – Wolfgang Pauli and Erwin Schrödinger show that the Rydberg formula for the spectrum of hydrogen follows from the new quantum mechanics
 1926 – Partial oxidation, Vandeveer and Parr at the University of Illinois used oxygen in the place of air for the production of syngas.
 1926 – Cyril Norman Hinshelwood described the phenomenon of chain reaction.
 1926 – Umberto Nobile made the first flight over the north pole with the hydrogen airship Norge
 1929 – Paul Harteck and Karl Friedrich Bonhoeffer achieve the first synthesis of pure parahydrogen.
 1929 – The hydrogen-filled LZ 127 Graf Zeppelin made a 33,234 km (20,651 mi; 17,945 nmi) circumnavigation of the world. It was the first and only airship to do so, and the second circumnavigation of the globe by air. The voyage took a total of 21 days, 5 hours, and 31 minutes.
 1930 – Rudolf Erren – Erren engine – GB patent GB364180 –  Improvements in and relating to internal combustion engines using a mixture of hydrogen and oxygen as fuel
 1935 – Eugene Wigner and H.B. Huntington predicted metallic hydrogen.
 1937 – The Zeppelin LZ 129 Hindenburg was destroyed by fire.
 1937 – The Heinkel HeS 1 experimental gaseous hydrogen fueled centrifugal jet engine is tested at Hirth in March- the first working jet engine
 1937 – The first hydrogen-cooled turbogenerator went into service at Dayton, Ohio.
 1938 – The first 240 km hydrogen pipeline Rhine-Ruhr.
 1938 – Igor Sikorsky from Sikorsky Aircraft proposed liquid hydrogen as a fuel.
 1939 – Rudolf Erren – Erren engine – US patent 2,183,674 –  Internal combustion engine using hydrogen as fuel
 1939 – Hans Gaffron discovered that algae can switch between producing oxygen and hydrogen.
 1941 – The first mass application of hydrogen in internal combustion engines: Russian lieutenant Boris Shelishch in the besieged Leningrad has converted some hundreds cars "GAZ-AA" which served posts of barrage balloons of air defense.
 1943 – Liquid hydrogen is tested as rocket fuel at Ohio State University.
 1943 – Arne Zetterström describes hydrox
 1947 – Willis Lamb and Robert Retherford measure the small energy shift (the Lamb shift) between the 2s1/2 and 2p1/2 levels of hydrogen, providing a great stimulus to the development of quantum electrodynamics
 1949 – Hydrodesulfurization (Catalytic reforming is commercialized under the name Platforming process)
 1951 – Underground hydrogen storage
 1952 – Ivy Mike, the first successful test of a nuclear explosive based on hydrogen (actually, deuterium) fusion
 1952 – Non-Refrigerated transport Dewar
 1955 – W. Thomas Grubb modified the fuel cell design by using a sulphonated polystyrene ion-exchange membrane as the electrolyte.
 1957 – Pratt & Whitney's model 304 jet engine using liquid hydrogen as fuel tested for the first time as part of the Lockheed CL-400 Suntan project.
 1957 – The specifications for the U-2 a double axle liquid hydrogen semi-trailer were issued.
 1958 – Leonard Niedrach devised a way of depositing platinum onto the membrane, this became known as the Grubb-Niedrach fuel cell
 1958 – Allis-Chalmers demonstrated the D 12, the first 15 kW fuel cell tractor.
 1959 – Francis Thomas Bacon built the Bacon Cell, the first practical 5 kW hydrogen-air fuel cell to power a welding machine.
 1960 – Allis-Chalmers builds the first fuel cell forklift
 1961 – RL-10 liquid hydrogen fuelled rocket engine first flight
 1964 – Allis-Chalmers built a 750-watt fuel cell to power a one-man underwater research vessel.
 1965 – The first commercial use of a fuel cell in Project Gemini.
 1965 – Allis-Chalmers builds the first fuel cell golf carts.
 1966 – General Motors presents Electrovan, the world's first fuel cell automobile.
 1966 – Slush hydrogen
 1966 – J-2 (rocket engine) liquid hydrogen rocket engine flies
 1967 – Akira Fujishima discovers the Honda-Fujishima effect which is used for photocatalysis in the photoelectrochemical cell.
 1967 – Hydride compressor
 1970 – Nickel hydrogen battery
 1970 – John Bockris or Lawrence W. Jones coined the term hydrogen economy 
 1973 – The 30 km hydrogen pipeline in Isbergues
 1973 – Linear compressor
 1975 – John Bockris – Energy The Solar-Hydrogen Alternative – 
 1979 – HM7B rocket engine
 1981 – Space Shuttle Main Engine first flight
 1988 – First flight of Tupolev Tu-155. This was a variant of the Tu-154 airliner designed to run on hydrogen.
 1990 – The first solar-powered hydrogen production plant Solar-Wasserstoff-Bayern became operational.
 1996 – Vulcain rocket engine
 1997 – Anastasios Melis discovered that the deprivation of sulfur will cause algae to switch from producing oxygen to producing hydrogen
 1998 – Type 212 submarine
 1999 – Hydrogen pinch
 2000 – Peter Toennies demonstrates superfluidity of hydrogen at 0.15 K

21st century

 2001 – The first type IV hydrogen tanks for compressed hydrogen at 700 bar (10000 PSI) were demonstrated.
 2002 – Type 214 submarine
 2002 – The first hydrail locomotive was demonstrated in Val-d'Or, Quebec.
 2004 – DeepC is an autonomous underwater vehicle propelled by an electric motor powered by a hydrogen fuel cell.
 2005 – Ionic liquid piston compressor
 2013 – The first commercial 2 megawatt power to gas installation in Falkenhagen comes online for 360 cubic meters of hydrogen per hour hydrogen storage into the natural gas grid.
 2014 – The Japanese fuel cell micro combined heat and power (mCHP) ENE FARM project passes 100,000 sold systems.
 2016 – Toyota releases its first hydrogen fuel cell car, the Mirai
 2017 – Hydrogen Council formed to expedite development and commercialization of hydrogen and fuel cell technologies
 2019 – Researchers at the KU Leuven university, Belgium, have developed a solar hydrogen panel that is able to produce 250l of H2 / d directly from sunlight and water vapor utilizing phytocatalytic water splitting and they are reporting a conversion efficiency of 15%. According to IEEE Spectrum this is a gain of +14,900% from the efficiency figure 10 years back (0.1%).

 2019 – Powerpaste, a magnesium and hydrogen-based fluid magnesium hydride paste, that releases hydrogen in a predictable manner when it reacts with water was published. Powerpaste is developed and patented by the Fraunhofer-Gesellschaft.
2021 – Enapter, co-founded by Vaitea Cowan, was awarded the 2021 Earthshot Prize for the ‘Fix our Climate’ category for its AEM Electrolyser technology which turns renewable electricity into emission-free hydrogen gas.
2022 – Researchers in Cambridge develop floating artificial leaves for light-driven hydrogen production. The lightweight, flexible devices are scalable and can float on water similar to lotus leaves.

See also
 Timeline of sustainable energy research 2020–present
 List of years in science ( in science)

References

Hydrogen technologies

Hydrogen